York: Terra Incognita is an outdoor monument by Alison Saar, installed near the Aubrey Watzek Library on the Lewis & Clark College campus, in Portland, Oregon. The brass sculpture commemorates York, an African-American explorer best known for his participation with the Lewis and Clark Expedition, and was dedicated on May 8, 2010. The  statue rests on an approximately  bronze base.

See also
 2010 in art
 Captain William Clark Monument, University of Portland

References

2010 establishments in Oregon
2010 sculptures
Brass sculptures
Lewis & Clark College
Monuments and memorials in Portland, Oregon
Outdoor sculptures in Portland, Oregon
Sculptures of African Americans
Statues in Portland, Oregon